This is a list of bus routes operated by the Chicago Transit Authority.

Routes running 24/7 are:
 The N4 (between 63rd/Cottage Grove and Washington/State only),
 N20 (between Washington/State and Austin),
 N22 (between Howard and Harrison),
 N49 (between 79th and Berwyn),
 N53 (between Harrison and Irving Park only),
 N55 (between Museum of Science and Industry and 55th/St. Louis only),
 N60 (between Washington/State and ),
 N62 (between Washington/State and Midway), 
 N66 (between Chicago/Pulaski and Washington/State),
 N77 (between Harlem and Halsted only),
 N79 (between Western and Lakefront only),
 N87 (between Western and  only).

Current Routes

Former Routes

References

External links
Chicago Transit Authority - official site, including a trip planner, and system maps.
ChicagoBus.org - a site covering CTA bus operations.
CTA Bus Tracker

Bus transportation in Illinois
Transit Authority Bus Routes

Chicago
Chicago